Grapevine yellow speckle viroid can refer to two different species of viroid, both in the genus Apscaviroid:

 Grapevine yellow speckle viroid 1
 Grapevine yellow speckle viroid 2

Viroids